Sridevi Ashok is an Indian actress who has worked in Tamil television. She made her debut in Pudhukottaiyilirundhu Saravanan.

Personal life 
Her parents are Selvaraj and Roopa.

She attended the A.V. Meiyappan School in Chennai. Sridevi earned a Master of Business Administration degree at Anna University, before becoming a television actress. 

She is married to Ashoka Chintala, and the couple have a daughter.

Career 
She appeared in Chellamadi Nee Enakku and in Thangam. She was later in Kalyana Parisu Season 1.

Filmography

Television

References 

Living people
Indian film actresses
People from Chennai district
Indian women
Actresses from Chennai
Actresses in Tamil cinema
Actresses in Telugu cinema
Tamil actresses
Actresses in Tamil television
Year of birth missing (living people)